Lee Min-Sung (이민성; born 23 June 1973) is a former South Korean football player and coach who currently coaching Jeonnam Dragons FC. He played for Busan I'cons and Pohang Steelers and FC Seoul and also represented South Korea national football team at international level.

He was a participant at the 1998 FIFA World Cup and at the 2002 FIFA World Cup and especially became well known for scoring the winner against Japan in the 1998 FIFA World Cup qualification.

Club career 
Lee played domestically for Pusan Daewoo Royals / Busan I'Cons, Sangmu (while on military service), Pohang Steelers, FC Seoul and  Yongin City FC.

International goals
Results list South Korea's goal tally first.

External links
  
 
  
 

1973 births
Living people
Association football midfielders
South Korean footballers
South Korea international footballers
Busan IPark players
Gimcheon Sangmu FC players
Pohang Steelers players
FC Seoul players
K League 1 players
Korea National League players
1998 FIFA World Cup players
2000 AFC Asian Cup players
2000 CONCACAF Gold Cup players
2001 FIFA Confederations Cup players
2002 FIFA World Cup players
2004 AFC Asian Cup players
Sportspeople from Gyeonggi Province
Ajou University alumni
South Korean football managers
Daejeon Hana Citizen FC managers